The Chinese motorcycle Grand Prix was a motorcycling event that was part of the World Motorcycle Racing season, from 2005 until 2008.

The Chinese grand prix was scheduled to run until 2011, but a low amount of spectator attendance, poor promotion and a lack of commercial interest caused the race to be scrapped from the 2009 calendar onwards.

Official names and sponsors
2005: Taobao.com Grand Prix of China
2006: Polini Grand Prix of China
2007: Sinopec Great Wall Lubricants Grand Prix of China
2008: Pramac Grand Prix of China

Winners of the Chinese motorcycle Grand Prix

Multiple winners (riders)

Multiple winners (manufacturers)

By year

References

 
Motorsport competitions in China
Recurring sporting events established in 2005
Recurring sporting events disestablished in 2008
2005 establishments in China
2008 disestablishments in China